The Uganda cricket team  toured Qatar in February 2020 to play a three-match Twenty20 International (T20I) series. The tour also included two 50-over games against a President's XI. The venue for all of the matches was the West End Park International Cricket Stadium in Doha. The series was won 2–1 by Qatar, and Qatari batsman Kamran Khan was named as player of the series.

Squads

Tour matches

1st 50-over match

2nd 50-over match

T20I series

1st T20I

2nd T20I

3rd T20I

Notes

References

External links
 Series home at ESPN Cricinfo

Associate international cricket competitions in 2019–20